Hansen v Boocock is a cited New Zealand case regarding cancellation of contracts under the Contractual Remedies Act 1979.

References

New Zealand contract case law
High Court of New Zealand cases
1991 in case law
1991 in New Zealand law